Grubno  is a village in the administrative district of Gmina Stolno, within Chełmno County, Kuyavian-Pomeranian Voivodeship, in north-central Poland. It is located in Chełmno Land within the historic region of Pomerania.

The village has a population of 594.

Transport
Grubno is located at the intersection of the Polish National road 91 and the Voivodeship road 550.

References

Villages in Chełmno County